Wyoming Highway 30 (WYO 30) is a  Wyoming state highway known locally as Otto Road located in southwestern Big Horn County. The highway serves the town of Burlington and unincorporated community of Otto.

Route description
Wyoming Highway 30 is mostly an east-west highway, but travels north-south at its west end. WYO 30 has its west end at US 14/US 16/US 20 in the unincorporated community of Emblem, just six-tenths of a mile west of Wyoming Highway 32's southern terminus. WYO 30 serves several small communities and ranches to the west of Worland and is an alternate to US 16/US 20 between Emblem and Basin. WYO 30 heads south reaching the town of Burlington at 3.79 miles. After leaving the town of Burlington, Highway 30 turns east to head toward Otto, reaching that community by 10.30 miles. WYO 30 continues east, to Basin intersecting Wyoming Highway 36 at its southern terminus. Shortly after, WYO 30 comes to its eastern end at US 16/US 20/WYO 789 (4th Street).Mileposts increase from east to west along Wyoming 30.

Major intersections

References

Official 2003 State Highway Map of Wyoming

External links 

Wyoming State Routes 000-099
WYO 30 - US 16/US 20/WYO 789 to WYO 36
WYO 30 - WYO 36 to US 14/US 16/US 20

Transportation in Big Horn County, Wyoming
030